Dawid Nowak (born 30 November 1984 in Hrubieszów) is a Polish footballer.

References

External links
 
 
 Dawid Nowak at Soccerway

1984 births
Living people
People from Hrubieszów
Sportspeople from Lublin Voivodeship
GKS Bełchatów players
MKS Cracovia (football) players
Bruk-Bet Termalica Nieciecza players
UKS SMS Łódź players
Puszcza Niepołomice players
Garbarnia Kraków players
Ekstraklasa players
I liga players
Polish footballers
Poland international footballers
Association football midfielders
Association football forwards